Rocco Giuseppe Moles (born 7 January 1967) is an Italian politician from Forza Italia.

Political career 
Moles is the Undersecretary to the Presidency of the Council of Ministers with responsibility for publishing in the Draghi Cabinet. He received two votes in the first round of the 2022 Italian presidential election.

References 

Living people
1967 births
Deputies of Legislature XVI of Italy
Senators of Legislature XVIII of Italy
Forza Italia politicians
Forza Italia (2013) senators